Iditarod may refer to:

 Iditarod, Alaska, an abandoned town in the Yukon–Koyukuk Census Area of Alaska
 Iditarod River, a river in western Alaska
 Iditarod Trail, a thousand-plus mile historic and contemporary trail system in Alaska
 Iditarod Trail Sled Dog Race, an annual sled dog team race across Alaska